N-Ethyl-5-trifluoromethyl-2-aminoindane (ETAI) is a psychoactive drug and research chemical with putative entactogenic effects. It functions as a selective serotonin releasing agent (SSRA). ETAI is the aminoindane analogue of fenfluramine and is approximately 50% as neurotoxic in comparison.

References

2-Aminoindanes
Trifluoromethyl compounds
Serotonin releasing agents
Entactogens and empathogens